George Perry (born April 12, 1953 in Lompoc, California) is the former Dean of the College of Sciences, Semmes Distinguished University Chair in  Neurobiology, Professor of Biology and Chemistry at the University of Texas at San Antonio. Perry is recognized in the field of Alzheimer's disease research particularly for his work on oxidative stress.

Education

Perry received his Bachelor of Arts degree in Zoology from University of California, Santa Barbara. After graduation, he studied at  Scripps Institution of Oceanography, Hopkins Marine Station of Stanford University, and the Marine Biological Laboratory at Woods Hole; he obtained his Ph.D from the University of California at San Diego in Marine Biology under David Epel in 1979. He then received a postdoctoral fellowship in the Department of Cell Biology in the laboratories of William R. Brinkley, Joseph Bryan and Anthony R. Means at Baylor College of Medicine where he laid the foundation for his observations of cytoskeletal abnormalities.

Professional appointments
In 1982, Perry joined the faculty of Case Western Reserve University, where he holds an adjunct appointment. He is dean of the College of Sciences and professor of biology at the  University of Texas at San Antonio . He is distinguished as one of the top Alzheimer’s disease researchers with over 1000 
publications, one of the top 100 most-cited scientists in Neuroscience & Behavior and one of the top 25 scientists in free radical research. Perry is highly cited (over 82,500 times;H=137;ISI/over 112,500 times;H=165;Google Scholar) and is recognized as an ISI highly cited researcher.

Perry is the current and founding editor-in-chief for the Journal of Alzheimer's Disease, an international multidisciplinary journal that specialises in Alzheimer's disease. He is also a member of the Alzheimer's Foundation of America Medical, Scientific, and Memory Screening Advisory Board.

Perry is fellow of the American Association for the Advancement of Sciences, Sigma Xi , Microscopy Society of America, International Engineering and Technology Institute (IETI), Texas Academy of Sciences, past-president and past-interim executive director of the Southwestern and Rocky Mountain Division of American Association for the Advancement of Sciences, past-Chair of the Board of the National Organization of Portuguese Americans and past-president of the American Association of Neuropathologists.

Research focus
Perry's research is primarily focused on the mechanism of formation and physiological consequences of the cytopathology of Alzheimer disease. He has played a key role in elucidating oxidative damage as the initial cytopathological abnormality in Alzheimer disease. He is currently working to determine the sequence of events leading to neuronal oxidative damage and the source of the increased oxygen radicals. His current studies focus on two issues: (i) the metabolic basis for the mitochondrial damage restricted to vulnerable neurons; and (ii) the consequences of RNA oxidation on protein synthesis rate and fidelity.

References

External links
Future Neurology Interview 
 Journal of Alzheimer's Disease
 UTSA Faculty Biography
 
 Science Watch Top 20 Alzheimer's Researchers
  PBS Interview
 Express-News Article

Alzheimer's disease researchers
American neuroscientists
Fellows of the American Association for the Advancement of Science
Fellows of the Linnean Society of London
Living people
American people of Portuguese descent
University of Texas at San Antonio faculty
Allan Hancock College alumni
University of California, Santa Barbara alumni
People from Lompoc, California
1953 births
Scripps Institution of Oceanography alumni